Lane McCray (born April 13, 1962) is an American singer, songwriter and rapper best known for fronting the famous '90s group La Bouche.

He was stationed at various military installations around the globe with the United States Air Force. As an all-around entertainer in the US, Lane performed in regional musical theater productions of West Side Story, A Chorus Line, Tom Foolery, Sophisticated Ladies and La Bohème.

McCray left the USAF to pursue his musical career full-time. It was in Saarbrücken, Germany where he met Melanie Thornton (1967–2001) when they fronted the cover band Groovin' Affairs, going on to form La Bouche.

After Thornton died in a 2001 plane crash while promoting a re-release of her solo album "Ready to Fly", McCray shied away from the limelight and took some time to mourn the death of his friend and partner. As of 2015, Lane (La Bouche) began working with a few different singers Dana Rayne, Timi Kullai, Sophie Cairo, Kim Sanders and Kayo Shekoni with him as the focal point.

In September 2019, Lane is set to release a brand new La Bouche single with subsequent tracks to follow to the release of a complete new CD from the group.

As of 2020 McCray has embarked on a new musical journey under his own namesake "MCCRAY" the first release on McCray Records was entitled "Save My Life" to which he said "there are many facets to all of us and for me there are just as many facets to my tastes in music" MCCRAY's new single entitled "I Keep Running" is set to release October 1, 2021.

Personal life
Lane is the son of Lane McCray Sr. (1937-2016) and Joyce McCray b.1940, brother of Doreen b.1958 and Deidre b 1959 and father of Shannon Breonna McCray b.1983 and grandfather to Hamza Ishmael and Hafsa.

Lane resides in Germany where he continues to express himself through painting and has established "Lane McCray Art Gallery", His works can be found and purchased on his official website.

Lane McCray devotes a great deal of his time educating people on HIV/AIDS through local, national, and international foundations.

Discography
2021 - I Keep Running (McCray Records)
2021 - Save My Life (McCray Records)
2020 - Ringing The Bells of Christmas (Blanco Y Negro)
2020 - One Night In Heaven (Nene Musik)
2018 - Night After Night (Nene Musik) 
2017 - Sweet Dreams 2017 (McCray Records)
2017 - Thankful (McCray Records)
2016 - I Feel You/Single Lane McCray Featuring BG The Prince of Rap (DMN Records)
2016 - Dream/Single by Lane McCray (DMN Records)
2015 - Sweet Dreams/Single by Lane McCray Vs DJane Monique (DMN Records)
2015 - Part of Me/Single by Lane McCray Featuring Maestro Riko (DMN Records)
2014 - Heartbeat/Single by Lane McCray Featuring Down South (DMN Records)
2008 - Be My Lady/Single (202 Digital)
2003 - In Your Life/Single (Logic Records)
2002 - In Your Life/Single (BMG Berlin/MCI)
2001 - All I Want/Single (BMG Berlin/MCI)
2000 - SOS/LP (US) (RCA)
1999 - A Moment of Love/LP (BMG Berlin/MCI)
1999 - You Won't Forget Me (BMG Berlin/MCI)
1999 - SOS/Single (RCA)
1997 - All Mixed Up/LP (RCA)
1996 - Falling in Love/Dance Mix (RCA)
1996 - Sweet Dreams/Single (RCA)
1995 - Be My Lover/Single (RCA)
1995 - Falling in Love/Single (BMG/Logic)
1995 - I Love to Love/Single (BMG/Berlin/MCI)
1995 - Be My Lover/Single (BMG Berlin/MCI)
1994 - Sweet Dreams/Single (BMG Berlin/MCI)

References
Lane McCray
Lane McCray Solo CD Dreamer 2017
Lane McCray's discography
McCray on heyfan

Eurodance musicians
20th-century African-American male singers
American dance musicians
American expatriates in Germany
American expatriates in Turkey
Musicians from Anchorage, Alaska
1960 births
Living people
People from Fort Bragg, North Carolina
21st-century African-American people